Perth Carriage Servicing Depot is a depot and stabling point located in Perth, Perthshire, Scotland. The depot is on the eastern side of the Highland Main Line, adjacent to Perth station.

The depot code is PH.

History 
The building was opened by the Caledonian Railway, prior to 1901, as a carriage shed. From 1958 to 1972, Class 06 and 08 shunters and Class 21 locomotives could be seen at the depot.

Present 
The depot has an allocation of Network Rail's Snow Train, including support coach ADB 977869.

References

Sources

 Railway depots in Scotland